Qaleh Gelineh (also Romanized as Qal‘eh Gelīneh, Qal‘eh Gellīneh, and Qal‘eh-ye Galīneh) is a village in Qaleh Shahin Rural District, in the Central District of Sarpol-e Zahab County, Kermanshah Province, Iran. At the 2006 census, its population was 208, in 42 families.

References 

Populated places in Sarpol-e Zahab County